Visitation of Mary Church is a Roman Catholic pilgrimage church under the authority of the Roman Catholic Archdiocese of Ljubljana, located on Rožnik Hill in Ljubljana, Slovenia.

History
A church was already recorded on Rožnik Hill in a 1526 document, stating that it had to provide a copper chalice and three pounds of hellers for the war effort. This church was razed in 1740, and a new church was built in 1746 according to plans by Candido Zulliani (1712–1769) and consecrated by Bishop Ernest Attems (1742–1757) in 1747. The church was damaged by artillery fire during the Napoleonic siege of Ljubljana, and after its 1814 renovation it was given a Neoclassical facade. Management of the church was taken over by the Franciscans in 1826, and in 1836 it was transferred to the order as a chapel of ease. New altars were installed in the church in 1895.

Gallery

References

Roman Catholic churches in Ljubljana
Baroque church buildings in Slovenia
Roman Catholic churches completed in 1747
18th-century Roman Catholic church buildings in Slovenia